The Buhrman–Pharr Hardware Company Historic District encompasses a pair of brick commercial buildings on 3rd Street in Texarkana, Arkansas.  The two four-story structures, located on the block between Laurel and Ash Streets, were built in 1914 and 1923 for the Buhrmann–Pharr Hardware Company, a significant force in the economic development of Texarkana for more than a century.  The company was founded in the late 1880s by W. J. Buhrman and J. L. Chatfield, the interest of the latter being taken over by F. E. Pharr in 1908.  Started as a modest retail establishment, the company grew to become one of the region's largest wholesale supplier of hardware and agricultural implements.  These two buildings were built to address the company's growth in the first decades of the 20th century.  The wholesale business was closed in 2001 and the retail establishment shut down two years later.

The district was listed on the National Register of Historic Places in 2004.

See also
National Register of Historic Places listings in Miller County, Arkansas

References

Buildings and structures completed in 1914
Miller County, Arkansas
Buildings designated early commercial in the National Register of Historic Places
Historic districts on the National Register of Historic Places in Arkansas
National Register of Historic Places in Miller County, Arkansas